Fort Adams State Park is a public recreation and historic area preserving Fort Adams, a large coastal fortification located at the harbor mouth in Newport, Rhode Island, that was active from 1841 through the first half of the 20th century. The state park hosts the annual Newport Jazz Festival and Newport Folk Festival and is the home of Sail Newport and Eisenhower House.

History
The area was originally owned by William Brenton, who called the region "Hammersmith," a name that survives in the name of the adjacent Hammersmith Farm. Following its long tenure as a military installation, the State of Rhode Island took possession of Fort Adams for use as a state park in 1965.

Activities and amenities
In addition to panoramic views of the harbor and Narragansett Bay, the park offers swimming, boating, picnicking, and athletic fields. The Joseph "Jay" Kirwin Memorial Rugby Pitch is home to Newport Rugby Football Club and to the rugby teams of Salve Regina University. In addition to the dedicated Kirwin rugby pitch, there are two soccer fields/rugby pitches. The annual Newport Rugby Sevens Tournament is held at the fort each summer.

The Fort Adams Trust offers seasonal guided tours of Fort Adams, the Fort Adams Advanced Southern Redoubt, and the Eisenhower “Summer White House."

Fort Adams State Beach is a small, shallow, roped-off area for swimming, with slightly rocky sand. The adjacent Dr. Fred Alofsin Special Events Building has bathrooms, showers, picnic tables, and a small parking lot.

Further reading
John Martin Hammond, Quaint and Historic Forts of North America. Philadelphia: J.B. Lippincott Company, 1915.
Patricia Harris, David Lyon, Journey to New England. Globe Pequot Press, 1999, pp. 20–21, .

References

External links
Fort Adams State Park Rhode Island Department of Environmental Management Division of Parks & Recreation
Fort Adams and the Fort Adams Trust The Fort Adams Trust

State parks of Rhode Island
Narragansett Bay
Geography of Newport, Rhode Island
Protected areas of Newport County, Rhode Island
Tourist attractions in Newport, Rhode Island
Sports venues in Rhode Island
Protected areas established in 1965
1965 establishments in Rhode Island